Bloomville is an unincorporated community located in the towns of Russell and Schley, in Lincoln County, Wisconsin, United States.

Notes

Unincorporated communities in Lincoln County, Wisconsin
Unincorporated communities in Wisconsin